For the adjacent park, see Fort Steilacoom Park

Fort Steilacoom was founded by the U.S. Army in 1849 near Lake Steilacoom. It was among the first military fortifications built by the U.S. north of the Columbia River in what was to become the State of Washington.  The fort was constructed due to civilian agitation about the massacre in 1847 at the Whitman mission.

Indians of the Nisqually tribe attacked white settlers in the area on October 29, 1855, as a result of their dissatisfaction with the Treaty of Medicine Creek that had been imposed on them the previous year, particularly angered that their assigned reservation curtailed the traditional fishing economy.  The fort was headquarters for the U.S. 9th Infantry Regiment during this "Indian War" of 1855-56.  In the course of the conflict, Volunteer U.S. Army Colonel Abram Benton Moses was killed.  At the conclusion of the war, Territorial Governor Isaac Stevens brought Chief Leschi of the Nisqually tribe to trial for the death of Moses during a skirmish at Connell's Prairie on October 31, 1855.

Since the death had occurred in combat, the United States Army refused to carry out the sentence of death on the grounds of Fort Steilacoom, maintaining that he was a prisoner of war. The territorial legislature therefore passed a law authorizing Leschi's execution at the hands of civilian authorities. On February 19, 1858, Leschi was hanged in what is today the city of Lakewood.  He was exonerated in 2004.

Fort Steilacoom was decommissioned as a military post in 1868.  In 1871 Washington Territory repurposed the fort as an insane asylum, with the barracks serving as patient and staff housing.  Fort Steilacoom is now Western State Hospital.

Four cottages from the fort remain on the site, and serve as a living history museum. The post cemetery also remains, containing civilian burials from the fort era.  All known military burials were relocated to the San Francisco National Cemetery in the 1890s.

References

External links 

  Historic Fort Steilacoom information
 Fort Steilacoom (1849-1868) on HistoryLink
 Findagrave: Fort Steilacoom post cemetery
 Findagrave: Military burials at Ft Steilacoom removed to San Francisco

Steilacoom
Lakewood, Washington
Museums in Pierce County, Washington
Military and war museums in Washington (state)
Closed installations of the United States Army
Buildings and structures in Pierce County, Washington
Steilacoom
National Register of Historic Places in Pierce County, Washington
1868 disestablishments in Washington Territory